iXL Enterprises was an international interactive agency that operated from 1996 until 2002. The company was founded by Atlanta entrepreneur Bert Ellis, who also served as the company's chairman and CEO. At the company's height in 1999, which coincided with the height of the dot-com boom, iXL had around 1500 employees, a quarterly revenue of $33 million, and was publicly traded on the Nasdaq exchange, with ticker symbol "IIXL". After a series of acquisitions, it is now part of the Razorfish agency, owned by Publicis Groupe.

iXL had its headquarters in Atlanta, with additional offices in Berlin, Boston, Charlotte, Chicago, Denver, Hamburg, London, Los Angeles, Madrid, New York City, Richmond, San Diego, San Francisco, São Paulo, Tokyo and Washington, D.C. The company also had smaller "satellite offices" in Amsterdam, Dallas and Memphis, Tennessee. Many of these offices started out as local interactive agencies that were purchased by iXL, such as Micro Interactive, which became the New York office. It was part of what some in the industry called "The Fast Five", a group of "e-consultancies" that also included Razorfish, Scient, Viant and USWeb/CKS.

Notable clients included GE, Delta Air Lines, Budget Rent-A-Car, Chase Bank, Merrill Lynch, The Home Depot, FedEx and WebMD. 

In the time of November 2001, iXL merged with former competitor Scient, with the two companies operating under the Scient name, but the leftovers were rebranded as Creative Bubble. In July 2002 the joint company filed for bankruptcy. Assets from Scient were purchased by SBI Group in 2003, and merged into Razorfish. That company was then acquired by aQuantive in 2004, and merged into Avenue A | Razorfish. aQuantive was then purchased by Microsoft in 2007, and then subsequently sold to Publicis Groupe in 2009.

References

Online companies of the United States
Marketing companies established in 1996
Companies disestablished in 2002
Online advertising services and affiliate networks